Bobby Krlic (born 20 December 1985), known by his stage name The Haxan Cloak, is a British composer, artist, music producer and musician.

The Haxan Cloak has released two full-length albums (2011's The Haxan Cloak and 2013's Excavation). As a producer, Krlic has worked with artists including Björk, Father John Misty, Khalid, Troye Sivan, Goldfrapp, serpentwithfeet and The Body. He has also composed several soundtracks, credited under his real name, including Ari Aster's 2019 horror film Midsommar, and television series Snowpiercer, Angel of Darkness and Reprisal.

Early life and education
Krlic was born and raised in Wakefield, West Yorkshire, England. He is of Serbian descent. He studied music and visual arts at the University of Brighton.

Music career

The Haxan Cloak releases 
Krlic's first release as The Haxan Cloak was the Observatory E.P., landing as a cassette via Aurora Borealis on Halloween 2010. A year later, Krlic recorded his first album, The Haxan Cloak, in his parents' shed using strings, mics and a laptop, playing every instrument himself. The second LP, Excavation, was released in 2013, and has a more electronic feel, using samples and heavy bass, along with distorted field recordings made by Krlic.

In 2012, The Haxan Cloak released a limited edition, one track, 27-minute live recording, The Men Parted the Sea to Devour the Water, as a part of Southern Records' Latitudes series.

Krlic has also released remixes of songs by other artists under The Haxan Cloak, including Father John Misty Foals and Björk.

Production credits 
In 2014, Krlic teamed up with American sludge metal band The Body to produce their 2014 album I Shall Die Here. In the same year he produced Victim by noise rock band HEALTH.

Krlic also collaborated with Björk as a co-producer on her album Vulnicura, released in January 2015. Since then, he produced serpentwithfeet's E.P. Blisters, Goldfrapp's 2017 album Silver Eye, Heaven by Khalid from 2019's Free Spirit, and by Troye Sivan's 2018 single Animal. He also produced Father John Misty's cover of Fallin' Rain. and co-produced his 2020 singles To S. / To R.

Scoring work 
Krlic was invited by Oscar-winning score composer Atticus Ross to work with him on Michael Mann's film Blackhat released in 2015. In 2016, Krlic continued his work with Ross, co-scoring Triple 9, directed by John Hillcoat, and the soundtrack to Almost Holy, a documentary directed by Steve Hoover.

In 2019, Krlic scored Ari Aster's second feature horror film Midsommar, for which Krlic won Best Original Score at the 2020 Ivor Novello Awards.

Within television, Krlic has scored a number of major network shows including TNT's Snowpiercer and Angel of Darkness, Hulu's Reprisal and Netflix's Seven Seconds.

In 2020 he collaborated with Swans on a Halloween Pass of Red Dead Redemption 2 by Rockstar Games.

Touring
In 2014, The Haxan Cloak toured the United States visiting Washington, DC, New York City, Chicago and Los Angeles. He performed at the Brooklyn Masonic Temple along with Robert Henke and his music and light show, Lumière, and in Los Angeles with Pharmakon. The New York Times called The Haxan Cloak's set "amorphous, ominous and immersive, a transcendent plunge into darkness and overwhelming pressure". The Haxan Cloak performed a solo show at Manchester International Festival in 2017. Bobby Krlic also joined Björk on her Vulnicura tour in the U.S (including The Governor's Ball in New York) and Europe.

Musical style
Krlic's music is almost entirely instrumental, and is often described as dark, carefully constructed, textured and atmospheric, with heavy bass and elements of drone metal. Of his albums, Krlic has said, "The first record was about a person's decline towards death, so this one's about the journey he takes afterwards." The name Haxan Cloak derives from the Swedish "häxan", meaning "the witch".

Excavation was rated a 9 out of 10 by Spin, and an 8.7 out of 10 by Pitchfork, who also named it the 29th-best album of 2013. Rolling Stone named it the 16th-best dance album of 2013.

Midsommar received wide critical praise including a 9/10 from The Line of Best Fit, ranked 2 in Insider's Top 20 Best Movie and TV Soundtracks of The Decade, and critic Glenn Kenny of The New York Times stating that “The remarkable music score by Bobby Krlic aka The Haxan Cloak is also a major contributor to the uncanny feeling the movie creates. Top Stuff."

Awards
2019: Midsommar – Nominee, Breakthrough Composer of the Year – International Film Music Critics Association
2020: Midsommar — Winner, Best Original Soundtrack – Ivor Novello Awards
2022: Returnal – Winner, Outstanding Achievement In Original Music Composition - DICE Awards
2022: Returnal – Winner, Best Music – BAFTA Games Awards

Personal life
Krlic moved from London to Los Angeles in 2015. As of 2016, he resides in the Silver Lake area.

Discography

Albums

Extended plays

Film soundtracks

TV & video game soundtracks

Songwriting and production credits

References

External links
 

1985 births
Alumni of the University of Brighton
British electronic musicians
British record producers
Dark ambient musicians
English film score composers
English male film score composers
English people of Serbian descent
Living people
Musicians from Wakefield